Dudi Sela was the defending champion but chose not to defend his title.

Lu Yen-hsun won the title after defeating Stefan Kozlov 6–0, 6–1 in the final.

Seeds

Draw

Finals

Top half

Bottom half

References
Main Draw
Qualifying Draw

China International Suzhou - Singles